Yen Kuo-che (born 5 December 1970) is a Taiwanese judoka. He competed in the men's half-heavyweight event at the 2000 Summer Olympics.

References

External links
 

1970 births
Living people
Taiwanese male judoka
Olympic judoka of Taiwan
Judoka at the 2000 Summer Olympics
Place of birth missing (living people)
Asian Games medalists in judo
Judoka at the 1990 Asian Games
Asian Games bronze medalists for Chinese Taipei
Medalists at the 1990 Asian Games
20th-century Taiwanese people